Verna Johnston (18 March 1930 – 4 April 2010) was an Australian sprinter and long jumper. She competed in the women's 4 × 100 metres relay and the long jump at the 1952 Summer Olympics.

References

1930 births
2010 deaths
Athletes (track and field) at the 1952 Summer Olympics
Australian female sprinters
Australian female long jumpers
Olympic athletes of Australia
Place of birth missing
Commonwealth Games medallists in athletics
Commonwealth Games gold medallists for Australia
Commonwealth Games bronze medallists for Australia
Athletes (track and field) at the 1950 British Empire Games
20th-century Australian women
21st-century Australian women
Medallists at the 1950 British Empire Games